The 1872 United States presidential election in North Carolina took place on November 5, 1872. All contemporary 37 states were part of the 1872 United States presidential election. The state voters chose 10 electors to the Electoral College, which selected the president and vice president.

North Carolina was won by the Republican nominees, incumbent President Ulysses S. Grant of Illinois and his running mate Senator Henry Wilson of Massachusetts. Grant and Wilson defeated the Liberal Republican and Democratic nominees, former Congressman Horace Greeley of New York and his running mate former Senator and Governor Benjamin Gratz Brown of Missouri. 

Grant won the state by a margin of 14.92%.

Results

References

North Carolina
1872
1872 North Carolina elections